The Goethe Monument is an outdoor 1880 memorial to German writer and statesman Johann Wolfgang von Goethe by Fritz Schaper, located in Tiergarten in Berlin, Germany. The sculpture's base depicts the allegorical figures of Drama, Lyric Poetry (and Amor), and Science.

See also

 1880 in art

References

External links
 

1880 establishments in Germany
1880 sculptures
Allegorical sculptures in Germany
Cultural depictions of Johann Wolfgang von Goethe
Statues in Berlin
Outdoor sculptures in Berlin
Sculptures of men in Germany
Sculptures of women in Germany
Statues in Germany
Statues of writers
Tiergarten (park)